"What Do You Want?" is a 1959 song that became a number one hit in the United Kingdom for Adam Faith. It was written by Les Vandyke, produced by John Burgess, and arranged by John Barry. It first appeared on the UK Singles Chart on 20 November 1959, and spent 19 weeks there. It was at number one for three weeks, sharing the position for the final week with "What Do You Want to Make Those Eyes at Me For?" by Emile Ford & the Checkmates, the last time two songs were at number one together. It is the shortest song yet to reach number one in the UK Singles Chart.

References

1959 singles
Parlophone singles
UK Singles Chart number-one singles
Bobby Vee songs
Adam Faith songs
Songs written by Les Vandyke
1959 songs

Song recordings produced by John Burgess